Hans G. Kresse (Amsterdam, 3 December 1921–Doorwerth, 12 March 1992) was a Dutch cartoonist. He was the winner of the 1976 Stripschapprijs.

Biography
Hans G. Kresse, born in the Netherlands in 1921, started his career as a comics artist in 1938 in the scouting magazine De Verkenner. He joined the Toonder Studios in 1944, where he worked on a  variety of comics, starting with the typical Toonder-style animal comic Robby, but soon changing to the first of Kresse's realistic works like De Gouden Dolk (1946). It was in this historical realistic style that he would continue to work for the remainder of his career. In the 1950s, he was also active as an illustrator for Donald Duck written by Dick Dreux.

The same year, he created his magnum opus, the Viking series Eric de Noorman. As was typical for Dutch comics at the time, it was a comic with the text below the drawings instead of inside text balloons. The comic first appeared in the Flemish newspaper Het Laatste Nieuws, and was later also published in the Netherlands and in Wallonia in French. The series continued until 1964, and a spinoff series Erwin, de Zoon van Erik de Noorman started as a regular ballon comic in 1966.

During and after those years, Kresse created many one shot comics and contributed numerous illustrations to many Dutch youth magazines. The most famous of his comics of these years are Matho Tonga, Vidocq, Mangas Coloradas and Alain d'Arcy.

His second main series, Les Peaux-Rouges, depicting the history of the Native Americans during the Spanish conquests of North America, debuted in 1973. Published at the famous French language editor Casterman, Kresse worked on it until 1982, when he had to retire due to failing eyesight.

Cartoons

 Tarzan van de apen (Tarzan of the apes, 1938-1940), in book format 1983
 Tom Texan (1940-1941), in book format 1983
 Siegfried (1943-1944), in book format 1990
 Robby (1945-1946), in book format 1986
 Per atoomraket naar Mars (By nuclear rocket to Mars, 1945), in book format 1945, 1948, 1986
 De gouden dolk (The gold dagger, 1946), in book format 1946, 1948, 1976
 Eric de Noorman (Eric the Norman, 1946-1964), in book format since 1948
 De grote otter (The giant otter, 1946), in book format 1946, 1953, 1994
 Xander (1947-1948), in book format 1974, 1990
 Detective Kommer (1947-1948), in book format 1949, 1950
 Matho Tonga (1948-1954), in book format 1977
 De zoon van het oerwoud (Son of the Jungle, 1954), in book format 1994
 Het Schatteneiland (Treasure Island, 1954), in book format 1994
 Roland de Jonge Jager (Roland the Young Hunter, 1957)
 Pim en de Venusman (Pim and the man from Venus, 1959-1960)
 Zorro (1964-1967), in book format 1974, 2005
 De boogschutter (The archer, 1965)
 Spin en Marty (Spin and Marty, 1965)
 Bonanza  (1965-1966), boekuitgave 2007
 Vidocq (1965-1970) and (1986-1988), in book format 1970, 1977, 1978, 1980, 1990, 1991, 1995
 Erwin, de zoon van Eric de Noorman (Erwin, son of Eric the Norman, 1966-1975), in book format 1970, 1973 (2 boeken) 
 Minimic (1970)
 Mangas Coloradas (1971-1972), in book format 1973, 1993
 Wetamo (1972-1973), in book format 1973, 1992
 Indian series: a comics series on the history of the indians in North America (1973-1982):
 1: De Meesters van de Donder (Masters of the Thunder, 1973, 1979)
 2: De Kinderen van de Wind (Children of the Wind, 1973, 1979)
 3: De Gezellen van het Kwaad (Companions of Evil, 1974, 1979)
 4: De Zang van de Prairiewolven (Song of the Prairie Wolves, 1974, 1979)
 5: De Weg van de Wraak (Route of Revenge, 1975, 1978)
 6: De Welp en de Wolf (Cub and the Wolf, 1976)
 7: De Gierenjagers (Vulture hunters, 1978)
 8: De Prijs van de Vrijheid (Price of Freedom, 1979)
 9: De Eer van een Krijger (Honor of a Warrior, 1982)
 10: De Lokroep van Quivera (Lure of Quivera, unfinished), in book format 2001
 Alain d'Arcy (1976-1978), in book format 1979, 1980, 1980/1981

References

Dutch cartoonists
Dutch comics artists
1921 births
1992 deaths
Artists from Amsterdam
Winners of the Stripschapsprijs